Brookesia therezieni, also known as the Perinet leaf chameleon, is a species of lizards in the family Chamaeleonidae.  The species is endemic to eastern Madagascar. The International Union for Conservation of Nature (IUCN) classed the species as Least Concern. B. therezieni was initially described as a species new to science by Édouard-Raoul Brygoo and Charles Antoine Domergue in 1970.

Etymology
The specific name, therezieni, is in honor of French hydrobiologist Yves Thérézien.

Distribution and habitat
Endemic to eastern Madagascar, Brookesia therezieni is found in the type locality of the species, Périnet, which is why it is known as the Perinet leaf chameleon. It is also found in the east-central area of Madagascar: An'Ala, Ankeniheny, Andasibe, Anjanaharibe, Mantadia, and Imerimandroso. Its preferred natural habitat is forest.

Reproduction
B. therezieni is oviparous.

Conservation status
The International Union for Conservation of Nature has ranked B. therezieni as Least Concern on its Red List of Threatened Species, as it is found on a too large area to be concerned about and  evidence is insufficient to indicate the number of specimens is declining quickly. However, the population is declining and their numbers have decreased.

Taxonomy
Brookesia therezieni was first described by Brygoo and Domerque in 1970. According to the Integrated Taxonomic Information System, the taxonomic status of this species is valid.

References

Further reading
Brygoo E-R, Domergue CA (1970). "Notes sur les Brookesia de Madagascar. V. Description de deux espèces nouvelles: B. lambertoni n. sp. et B. therezieni n. sp. (Chameleonidae)". Bulletin du Muséum national d'Histoire naturelle, Paris 41 (5): 1091-1096. (Brookesia therezieni, new species). (in French).
Glaw F, Vences M (2007). A Field Guide to the Amphibians and Reptiles of Madagascar, Third Edition. Cologne, Germany: Vences & Glaw Verlag. 496 pp. .
Nečas P (1999). Chameleons: Nature's hidden jewels. Frankfurt am Main, Germany: Edition Chimaira. 348 pp.  (Europe),  (USA, Canada). (Brookesia therezieni, p. 277).

T
Endemic fauna of Madagascar
Reptiles of Madagascar
Reptiles described in 1970
Taxa named by Édouard-Raoul Brygoo
Taxa named by Charles Domergue
Fauna of the Madagascar subhumid forests